The Radium Pool is a collection of science fiction short stories by American writer Ed Earl Repp.  It was published in 1949 by Fantasy Publishing Company, Inc. in an edition of 700 hardcover and 300 paperback copies.  The stories originally appeared in the magazines Amazing Stories and Science Wonder Stories.

Contents
 "The Phantom of Terror"
 "The Radium Pool"
 "The Red Dimension"

References

1949 short story collections
Science fiction short story collections
Fantasy Publishing Company, Inc. books